Badaruddoza Khan is a member of the Communist Party of India (Marxist) and has won the 2014 Indian general elections from the Murshidabad (Lok Sabha constituency).

Badaruddoza Khan graduated in science from the University of Calcutta in 1976 and completed B.Ed. in 1979. He served Gudhia High School in Murshidabad district.
 
He was involved in politics from his younger days. He has been president of the West Bengal state committee of All Bengal Teachers Association (ABTA) since 2012. He was a member of the West Bengal Board of Secondary Education during 2007-2012.

References

Living people
India MPs 2014–2019
Lok Sabha members from West Bengal
People from Murshidabad district
Communist Party of India (Marxist) politicians from West Bengal
University of Calcutta alumni
1954 births